Thomas Fennelly (27 January 1845 – 24 December 1927) was the Archbishop of the Roman Catholic Archdiocese of Cashel and Emly from 1902 until his retirement in 1913.

Fennelly was educated at Thurles College; St Vincent’s, Castleknock; and St Patrick's College, Maynooth. He was ordained in 1870. He was parish priest of Moycarkey from 1889 until his appointment as Coadjutor Bishop of Cashel in 1901.
He succeeded Archbishop Croke on 22 July 1902.

References

1845 births
1927 deaths
20th-century Roman Catholic archbishops in Ireland
Roman Catholic archbishops of Cashel
People from County Tipperary
Alumni of St. Patrick's College, Thurles
Alumni of St Patrick's College, Maynooth